Aðalsteinn Aðalsteinsson (born 25 April 1962) is an Icelandic former footballer, who played as a midfielder, and now a football manager. He won four caps for the Iceland national football team between 1982 and 1990. He is currently the manager of 4. deild karla team Ungmennafélagið Skallagrímur. He was appointed manager in 2015.

References
Aðalsteinn Aðalsteinsson international appearances at ksi.is

1962 births
Living people
Icelandic footballers
Iceland international footballers
Iceland under-21 international footballers
Association football midfielders
Knattspyrnufélagið Víkingur players
SK Djerv 1919 players
Íþróttafélagið Völsungur players
Knattspyrnufélagið Víkingur managers
Expatriate footballers in Norway
Icelandic expatriate sportspeople in Norway
Icelandic football managers